Samuel "Fish Hook" Mulford (1644–1725) got his nickname when he went to London in 1704 to protest the tax on whale oil, which he used in farming.  Warned beforehand of the sly workings of pickpockets in the great foreign metropolis, the canny and cautious Mr. Mulford lined his pockets with fishhooks to foil the would-be thieves.

The old Mulford farmhouse, which overlooks the Village Green of East Hampton, is one of the oldest in the county of Suffolk. It is one of the nation's most significant, intact English colonial farmsteads.  It is listed on the National Register of Historic Places. The Mulford farmhouse was built in 1680 by High Sheriff Josiah Hobart, an important early official of the first New York Royal Province government. Samuel "Fish Hook" Mulford bought the property in 1712 when Mr. Hobart died.  It is owned and operated as a living museum by East Hampton Historical Society.  The society bought the farm in 1957.  Villagers started a fund in 1948 to preserve the farm.

Mulford was a legislator in all the governments of the colony of New York during his time.  He was also a whale oil merchant.  He had warehouses on Northwest Harbor, east side, along with other merchants in his village.  Merchants Path is the name of the road to the warehouses.

References

 The New York Times, Tuesday, June 11, 1957.

1644 births
1725 deaths